Oulun Palloseura (OPS) is a Finnish professional football club based in Oulu. Founded in 1925, the club is currently competing in the Finnish second tier – Ykkönen.

History
The original Oulun Palloseura (Oulu Ball Club) was founded in 1925.

Contemporary club which is now called Oulun Palloseura dates back to 2006, when a third-tier club called FC Dreeverit was cleared to use the name OPS-jp. Next year the competition spot went to a registered association called Oulun Palloseura – jalkapallo ry. and then in 2008 to Oulun jalkapallon tuki ry. which is founded by businessman Miika Juntunen.

In 2009 OPS-jp won the Group C of Kakkonen (the 3rd tier) and was promoted to Ykkönen. Since 2011 the club has been allowed to use the original name of Oulun Palloseura.

Season to season

Current squad

External links
Official website 

Football clubs in Finland
Association football clubs established in 2000